The 2013 FC Shakhter Karagandy season was the 22nd successive season that Shakhter played in the Kazakhstan Premier League, the highest tier of association football in Kazakhstan.

Squad

Transfers

Winter

In:

Out:

Summer

In:

Out:

Competitions

Kazakhstan Super Cup

Kazakhstan Premier League

Regular season

Results summary

Results by round

Results

League table

Championship round

Results summary

Results by round

Results

League table

Kazakhstan Cup

UEFA Champions League

Qualifying rounds

UEFA Europa League

Group stage

Squad statistics

Appearances and goals

|-
|colspan="14"|Players away on loan:

|-
|colspan="14"|Players who appeared for Shakhter Karagandy that left during the season:

|}

Goal scorers

Disciplinary record

Notes

References

FC Shakhter Karagandy seasons
Shakhter
Shakhter